Cordura is a collection of synthetic fiber-based fabric technologies used in a wide array of products including luggage, backpacks, trousers, military wear and performance apparel.

Originally developed and registered as a trademark by E.I. du Pont de Nemours and Company (DuPont) in 1929, it is now the property of Invista, a fully owned subsidiary of Koch Industries. Cordura fabrics are usually made of nylon, but can be a blend of nylon with cotton or other natural fibers.

Overview
DuPont originally introduced the fabric as a type of rayon. In a 1948 advertisement, Du Pont described the research leading to the product’s creation: “DuPont scientists were working to improve on the properties of rayon…when, in 1928, a rubber company asked for a rayon yarn that would be stronger than cotton for tire cords. The problem was given to a team of organic, physical, and analytical chemists, chemical and mechanical engineers, and physicists. In developing the new improved rayon, a number of theoretical studies were carried out: for example, (1) rates of diffusion of the coagulating bath into the viscose filaments, (2) the mechanism of coagulation of viscose,  (3) the relationship between fiber structure and properties by X-rays, and (4) a phase study of spinning baths. Concurrently, applied research was necessary. This proceeded along many lines, but the main problem was the spinning technique. It was known that a short delay in the bath between the spinneret and the stretching operation allowed greater tension on the filaments. DuPont engineers, therefore, designed a series of rollers, each revolving faster than the previous one, to increase the tension gradually. In addition, a textile finish was developed that combined just the right amount of plasticizing action and lubricating power, allowing the filaments to twist evenly in forming the cord. A new adhesive was prepared to join the yarn with rubber. New twisting techniques for cord manufacture were found, since the usual methods caused loss in rayon strength. Chemical and mechanical engineers were faced with the design and operation of equipment for more than 15 different types of unit operations. Equipment had to operate every minute of the day, yet turn out perfectly uniform yarn. It was necessary to filter the viscose so carefully that it would pass through spinning jet holes less than 4/1000 of an inch without plugging. Some of the most exacting temperature and humidity control applications in the chemical industry were required. Out of the cooperation among scientists—ranging from studies of cellulose as a high polymer to design of enormous plants—came a new product, “Cordura” high-tenacity rayon, as strong as mild steel yet able to stand up under repeated flexing. = Tires made with it are less bulky and cooler running, yet give greater mileage under adverse operating conditions. 

The product was further developed during World War II and used in tires for military vehicles. In 1966, when new formulations of nylon proved superior, the Cordura brand name was transferred to the nylon product instead. In 1977 researchers discovered a process for dyeing Cordura, which opened a wide variety of commercial applications. By 1979 soft-sided Cordura luggage had captured about 40 percent of the luggage market. 
Several brands today continue to use Cordura fabric in their products. Eastpak was the first brand to use Cordura fabric in their packs, and JanSport used the canvas-like nylon in their original daypacks in the 1970s, and uses polyester cordura exclusively today. In the 1980s, Manhattan Portage began using 1000 denier (D) Cordura nylon in their bags. In the 1990s, European workwear clothing brands adopted the 1000D and 500D fabric for reinforcements. Clothing brands such as F. Engel, Fristads Kansas, Snickers and Scruffs use the fabric.
Cordura is also used today in most mid- to high-quality textile motorcycle jackets and pants for its high abrasion resistance. It is found in motorcycle gear made by companies such as Klim, Rukka, MotoPort, Rev'It, Olympia, AeroStich, and Dainese.

Cordura fabrics are available in a wide range of constructions, weights and aesthetics, including versions designed primarily for tear resistance and color retention. There are also base layer, denim and canvas fabrics that contain blends of Invista 420 D nylon 6,6 fiber and cotton, known as "Cordura Baselayer", "Cordura Denim", and "Cordura Duck", respectively.

Some Cordura fabrics have been designed specifically for military and extended outdoor use. Cordura fabrics have been used in military applications for over 45 years, and many US military fabric specifications are based on Cordura brand fabrics.

References

External links
 

Synthetic fibers
Products introduced in 1929
Koch Industries
Brand name materials